The Grand Slam of Curling (branded as the Pinty's Grand Slam of Curling for sponsorship reasons) is a series of curling bonspiels that are a part of the annual World Curling Tour. Grand Slam events offer a purse of at least CAD$100,000, and feature the best teams from across Canada and around the World. The Grand Slam was instituted during the 2001–02 season for men and 2006–07 for women (with the 2006 Players' Championship also considered a Slam), but some of the Grand Slam events have longer histories as bonspiels.

The Grand Slam season consists of six men's and women's events. The original four events (Masters, Open, National, and Players' Championship) are considered to be "majors". The other two slams (Tour Challenge and Champions Cup) have unique formats that set them apart from other events on the World Curling Tour.

History
In 2001, many curlers were upset with the Canadian Curling Association (CCA). Their complaints included the long curling season, not getting any prize money at the Brier, the national men's curling championship, which generated millions for the CCA, and the inability to have sponsors at the Brier. Eighteen of the top twenty curling teams, known as the "Original 18", agreed to boycott the Brier from 2001 to 2003 and created the Grand Slam of Curling. The original 18 skips were Dave Boehmer, Kerry Burtnyk, Pierre Charette, Glen Despins, Dale Duguid, Bert Gretzinger, Glenn Howard, Bruce Korte, Allan Lyburn, William Lyburn, Kevin Martin, Greg McAulay, Wayne Middaugh, Kevin Park, Brent Pierce, Vic Peters, Peter Steski and Jeff Stoughton.

The Grand Slam of Curling began in the 2001–02 curling season with four events: the Canadian Open, Masters, National, and Players' Championship, the four "majors".

After the merger of the Women's Tour and the WCT, the 2006 Players' Championship featured a women's event for the first time, and was considered a Slam for the women too. In the 2006–07 curling season, several existing women's events were designated as Grand Slams, but were not operated by the Grand Slam of Curling. Grand Slam games also got reduced to eight ends that season.

In 2012, Sportsnet purchased the Grand Slam of Curling. As such, television rights to the series have also defaulted to Sportsnet, though certain events may still air championship rounds on CBC.

In 2017, Yare TV began broadcasting online streams of the Grand Slams, opening up access to fans outside of Canada.

Under this new ownership, the separate women's Grand Slams were phased out, with women's divisions added to existing men's Grand Slams. New Grand Slam events were also added: the Elite 10 in the 2014–15 curling season and the Tour Challenge and Champions Cup in the 2015–16 curling season. A women's division was added to the Elite 10 in the 2018–19 curling season, achieving for the first time equal number of events, prize money, and television time for men and women. The Elite 10 was dropped the next season, bringing the number of events to six.

The COVID-19 pandemic cancelled the remaining two slams of the 2019-20 curling season and all but the remaining two slams of the 2020–21 curling season. The 2020–21 season was supposed to include the first international Grand Slam, the Canadian Open (renamed to the Open) to be held in Las Vegas, Nevada, United States.

Current Grand Slams

National

The National was introduced as a men's event in 2002, and was added to the women's side in 2015.

Champions

1 There was no National in the 2004–2005 season, but the BDO Curling Classic was held. It returned to its original name in the 2005–2006 season.  The words "BDO Classic" were added to the name of the Canadian Open.

Tour Challenge

The GSOC Tour Challenge was introduced as a men's and women's event in the 2015–16 curling season. The Tour Challenge has two tiers, with the bottom tier including regional invitations. The Tier 2 winning team qualifies for a subsequent grand slam.

Champions
The winning skip for Tier 1 is listed above the Tier 2 winning skip.

Masters

The Masters was introduced as a men's event 2002, and was added to the women's side in 2012.

Champions

Canadian Open

The Canadian Open was introduced as a men's event in 2001, and was added to the women's side in 2014. The Canadian Open is the only Grand Slam that uses a triple knockout format. 

Champions

Players' Championship

The Players' Championship, the oldest tournament on the men's Grand Slam of Curling, was introduced as a men's event in 1993, and added to the women's side in 2006.

Champions

Champions Cup

The Champions Cup was introduced as a men's and women's event in the 2015–16 curling season. The Champions Cup is contested by champions of various Grand Slam, Season of Champions, World Curling Tour, and other events throughout the season.

Champions

Statistics: Grand Slams won
This is a list of Grand Slam events won per player, including Players' Championships won prior to the creation of the Grand Slam.

Men

As of the 2023 Canadian Open

Women

As of the 2023 Canadian Open; Minimum 2 wins

Note: Totals due not include wins prior to the first Grand Slam season of 2006–07, excepting the Players'.

Former Grand Slams

Sobeys Slam

The Sobeys Slam was held as a Grand Slam event on three occasions in New Glasgow, Nova Scotia.

Champions

Wayden Transportation Ladies Classic

The Wayden Transportation Ladies Classic was held annually in Abbotsford, British Columbia, and was held nine times before it was discontinued.

Champions

Manitoba Lotteries Women's Curling Classic

The Manitoba Women's Curling Classic was held in Portage la Prairie, Manitoba, and was held eight times as a Grand Slam tournament. It was removed from the Grand Slam lineup starting in the 2014–15 curling season.

Champions

Curlers' Corner Autumn Gold Curling Classic

The Autumn Gold Curling Classic is held annually in Calgary, Alberta, and has been held 42 times (as of 2019). It offers a total purse of $50,000. It was removed from the Grand Slam lineup starting in the 2015–16 curling season.

Colonial Square Ladies Classic

The Colonial Square Ladies Classic is held annually in Saskatoon, Saskatchewan, and has been held since 1983. It officially became a Grand Slam event in 2012. It was removed from the Grand Slam lineup starting in the 2015–16 curling season.

Elite 10

The Elite 10 was introduced as a men's event in 2015, and added to the women's side in September 2018. The Elite 10 used a unique match play format, similar to skins curling. The event was dropped for the 2019–20 curling season.

Champions

Pinty's Cup
Beginning with the 2012–13 season, at the end of the season, the top Grand Slam team wins the "Rogers Grand Slam Cup", where they are awarded $75,000. The cup was renamed to the "Bonus Cup" for the 2017–18 season, and then the "Pinty's Cup" in 2018–19. Teams accumulate points based on their performance in each of the slams except for the Champions Cup and Tour Challenge Tier 2.

References

Sources
CurlingZone.com
WorldCurlingTour.com 

 
World Curling Tour
International curling competitions